The 2004 Maidstone Borough Council election took place on 10 June 2004 to elect members of Maidstone Borough Council in Kent, England. One third of the council was up for election and the council stayed under no overall control.

After the election, the composition of the council was:
Conservative 23
Liberal Democrat 20
Labour 9
Independent 3

Background
Before the election both the Conservative and Liberal Democrat parties had 21 seats, with 10 Labour and 3 independent councillors making up the council. 19 seats were being contested with the Conservatives and Liberal Democrats defending 7 each, Labour 4 and an independent 1 seat. A total of 80 candidates were standing in the election with both the Conservative and Labour parties having a full 19 candidates. The Liberal Democrats had 18 candidates, the United Kingdom Independence Party 17, Green Party 5, British National Party 1 and 1 independent candidate.

Election result
Overall turnout in the election was 39.33%.

Ward results

References

2004 English local elections
2004
2000s in Kent